The Great Osage Trail, also known as the Osage Trace or the Kaw Trace, was one of the more well-known Native American trails through the countryside of what are today called the Midwest and Plains States of the U.S., pathways originally created by herds of Buffalo or other migrating wildlife (Medicine Trails).

The Osage Indians and other tribes traveled among a variety of routes later named "Osage Trails" by European settlers; the famous Route 66 through southern Missouri Ozarks follows the route of one such "Osage Trail" and U.S. Route 24 through central Missouri follows the route (from Franklin, Missouri westward) of the "Great Osage Trail", which in 1825 became known as the first phase of the Santa Fe Trail, extending from central Missouri (near Franklin and Boonville, Missouri) westward shadowing the route of the Missouri River, then turning southwestward through Independence, Missouri, into Kansas, Colorado, Santa Fe, New Mexico, and "Old" Mexico. From an 1881 History of Jackson County, Missouri,

"The Santa Fe trade first began at Old Franklin, a little town on the Missouri River... and continued from this point till the year 1831, when it sprung up at Independence.  The town of Independence being a hundred miles further west, and near the great bend of the Missouri River, it was thought to be a more favorable place for fitting out caravans for Mexico, since also the route could be made from Franklin to Independence much better by water than land.  At Independence the bulk of the trade continued till about the years 1838-40, when it began at Westport, and subsequently at Westport Landing (now Kansas City)...."

Iroquois Tree of Peace and the Trail

  
On October 24, 1999, Iroquois chieftain Jake Swamp oversaw a ceremonial planting of an Iroquois "Tree of Peace" alongside the route of the Great Osage Trail, a few yards south of Lexington Street in Independence, Missouri, on the property of the Community of Christ's Independence Temple and on the site of the Latter-day Saint "Temple Site" property claimed and then purchased by Mormon leadership in 1831. A 1979 article in an LDS Church magazine discusses early Latter-day Saint travels along the Boone's Lick Road from St. Louis to Franklin in the central part of the state, then along the Great Osage Trail/Santa Fe Trail from Franklin to Missouri's western border.

References

External links 
Extensive resources at the web site "Santa Fe Trail Research.com"
Santa Fe Trail origins in Osage Indian territory explained at "Kaw Mission State Historical Site" website.
Generic map of Missouri and its highway system today, at "Geology.com"

Native American trails in the United States
Santa Fe Trail
Historic trails and roads in Missouri
Pre-statehood history of Missouri
Trails and roads in the American Old West
Historic trails and roads in New Mexico
Historic trails and roads in Kansas
Historic trails and roads in Colorado
Archeology
Pre-Columbian cultures
Native American history of Missouri
Native American history of New Mexico
Native American history of Kansas
Native American history of Colorado